Dalseo District (Dalseo-gu) is a district in western Daegu, South Korea.  It borders Dalseong-gun on the north, south, and west, and Seo-gu and Nam-gu on the east.  It has a population of about 610,000, and an area of 62.27 square kilometers.  The population rose dramatically in the 1990s, and has been approximately level since 2000.

Subdivisions

Bolli-dong
Bon-dong
Dowon-dong
Duryu-dong (3 administrative dong)
Gamsam-dong
Igok-dong (2 administrative dong)
Janggi-dong
Jincheon-dong
Jukjeon-dong
Sangin-dong (3 administrative dong)
Seongdang-dong (2 administrative dong)
Sindang-dong
Songhyeon-dong (2 administrative dong)
Wolseong-dong (2 administrative dong)
Yongsan-dong (2 administrative dong)

Education
Sangin High School (2001)

Notable people
 Song Hye-kyo, actress
 Bona, singer (WJSN)
 Kim Dong-han, singer (WEi)

See also
Subdivisions of South Korea

External links
  

 
Districts of Daegu